Joubert Araújo Martins, or simply Beto (born 7 January 1975, in Cuiabá) is a Brazilian former footballer who played as a midfielder. During his career, he played for several Brazilian clubs such as Botafogo, Grêmio, Flamengo, Fluminense and Vasco da Gama.

After a very promising beginning to his career with Botafogo, Beto made his debut for the Brazil national team in 1995, in a friendly match against Argentina, in Buenos Aires, which Brazil won 1–0. He later played for the national team on 13 occasions, and was a member of the squad that won the 1999 Copa América, in Paraguay.

Beto won the Brazilian national championship with Botafogo de Futebol e Regatas, in 1995, and the Rio de Janeiro state championship three times in a row, in 1999, 2000 and 2001, for Flamengo. With Flamengo, he became a fan-favourite, not only for his noteworthy ability, but also because of his fighting spirit, which he famously demonstrated in the 2000 and 2001 finals against Vasco da Gama.

Career statistics

Club

International

Performances in Major International Tournaments

Honours

Club
Brazilian League: 1995
Guanabara Cup: 1999
Rio de Janeiro state championship: 1999, 2000, 2001, 2002, 2003

International
Brazil
Pre-Olympic Tournament: 1996
Copa América: 1999

References

External links
 
 

 Beto at websoccerclub.com  
 Beto at netvasco.com.br 

1975 births
Living people
People from Cuiabá
Brazilian footballers
Brazilian expatriate footballers
Brazil international footballers
Association football midfielders
Expatriate footballers in Italy
Expatriate footballers in Japan
Botafogo de Futebol e Regatas players
S.S.C. Napoli players
Grêmio Foot-Ball Porto Alegrense players
CR Flamengo footballers
São Paulo FC players
Fluminense FC players
CR Vasco da Gama players
Hokkaido Consadole Sapporo players
Sanfrecce Hiroshima players
Campeonato Brasileiro Série A players
Campeonato Brasileiro Série B players
J1 League players
J2 League players
Serie A players
Brasiliense Futebol Clube players
1995 Copa América players
1996 CONCACAF Gold Cup players
1999 Copa América players
1999 FIFA Confederations Cup players
Copa América-winning players
Sportspeople from Mato Grosso